No Half Measures Ltd. is a music management company operating within the music and entertainment business.

Based in Glasgow (Scotland) No Half Measures Ltd deals with a wide variety of areas in the music industry including artist management, marketing and promotion, live performance, presentation and touring, event management and logistics, intellectual property & rights management, music publishing, recording, manufacturing, distribution, sponsorship and branding and much more.

Since its inception, the company has worked with a diverse range of artists from nurturing emerging talent such as The Law to dealing with established household favourites Wet Wet Wet.

Currently on the roster are:

 Hue and Cry
 Cosmic Rough Riders
 The Hedrons
 The Law

External links
No Half Measures official website
Interview with Dougie Souness on Cnet UK (December 2006)
Interview with Dougie Souness in The Independent (March 2008)
Dougie Souness at ILMC 21 (March 2009)

Companies based in Glasgow